The 2016 Masters (officially the 2016 Dafabet Masters) was a professional non-ranking snooker tournament that took place between 10 and 17 January 2016 at the Alexandra Palace in London, England. It was the 42nd staging of the Masters tournament and the fifth successive time it was held at the Alexandra Palace.

The defending champion Shaun Murphy lost 4–6 against Mark Allen in the first round. Murphy forfeited the sixth frame of the match by missing a red on three consecutive occasions.

The quarter-final between Judd Trump and Neil Robertson produced six century breaks, setting a new record for the most centuries in an 11-frame match. These included the two highest breaks of the tournament, 140 from Trump and 139 from Robertson. The match was singled out for particular praise, with John Virgo calling it one of the greatest in Masters history.

Playing in his first major televised tournament since taking an eight-month hiatus from professional snooker, Ronnie O'Sullivan reached a record-extending 11th Masters final and won the tournament for a sixth time, equalling Stephen Hendry's record for the most Masters titles. Losing only the first frame, he defeated Barry Hawkins 10–1, the biggest winning margin since Steve Davis whitewashed Mike Hallett 9–0 in 1988, and the first time a player had won ten consecutive frames in a Masters final.

Field
Defending champion Shaun Murphy was the number 1 seed with World Champion Stuart Bingham seeded 2. The remaining places were allocated to players based on the world rankings after the 2015 UK Championship. Liang Wenbo made his debut at the Masters after he entered the top 16 due to reaching the final of the 2015 UK Championship.

Prize fund
The breakdown of prize money is shown below: 
Winner: £200,000
Runner-up: £90,000
Semi-finals: £50,000
Quarter-finals: £25,000
Last 16: £12,500
Highest break: £10,000
Total: £600,000

Main draw

Final

Century breaks
Total: 26

140, 129, 105, 104, 103  Judd Trump
139, 106, 100  Neil Robertson
137, 109, 104  Mark Allen
136, 121, 117, 104, 100  Ronnie O'Sullivan
133, 120, 119, 104  John Higgins
130, 128, 100  Barry Hawkins
120  Stuart Bingham
113  Mark Selby
100  Shaun Murphy

References

2016 in English sport
Masters
2016 in snooker
January 2016 sports events in the United Kingdom
2016